The 1997–98 Liga Nacional de Fútbol Femenino was the 11th season of the Spanish women's football first division. Atlético Málaga won its first title.

Group 1

Group 2
Olímpico Fortuna and Gavilán retired during the season and all their matches were invalidated.

Group 3

Group 4

Final four
The Final Four was played on 8 and 10 May 1998 between the four group winners.

References

1997-98
Spa
1
women